Hans Brugman (born 10 January 1945) is a Dutch equestrian. He competed in two events at the 1972 Summer Olympics.

References

1945 births
Living people
Dutch male equestrians
Olympic equestrians of the Netherlands
Equestrians at the 1972 Summer Olympics
Sportspeople from Glasgow